Deborah Adair (born Deborah Adair Miller) is an American television actress, primarily known for her roles in soap operas.

Early life
 
Born in Lynchburg, Virginia, Adair attended the University of Washington, where she earned a degree in advertising and marketing. She worked as a copywriter, commercial producer and assistant promotion manager for radio stations in Seattle, Washington. Adair was married to politician Gary Baker for four years, divorcing in 1978.

Career
Adair went to Hollywood and found an agent who helped her land small parts in several television series. Her big break came in 1980 when she was cast as Jill Foster Abbott on the daytime soap opera The Young and the Restless. In 1983, she left The Young and the Restless to take the role of Tracy Kendall in the primetime soap opera Dynasty, a role she played until 1984. She followed this with the regular role of Daisy Lloyd in another Aaron Spelling series, Finder of Lost Loves, in 1984. In 1986, she made a one-week return to The Young and the Restless to reprise her role as Jill. She also appeared on the daytime soap opera Santa Barbara for a few episodes.

Adair married television producer Chip Hayes in 1987. She worked with her husband on the primetime soap opera Melrose Place, in which she played the recurring role of advertising executive Lucy Cabot from 1992 to 1993. She also portrayed the role of Kate Roberts on Days of Our Lives in 1993 and became one of few actors to concurrently play in a daytime soap opera and a nighttime soap opera. She left Melrose Place while continuing on Days of our Lives, a role for which she won the Best Supporting Actress Award at the Soap Opera Digest Award in 1994.

In total, Adair has appeared in seven projects produced by Aaron Spelling; Dynasty, Matt Houston, The Love Boat, Finder of Lost Loves, Hotel (in which she played four roles between 1984–87), Melrose Place and the television movie Rich Men, Single Women (1990). She has also appeared in a variety of other primetime series such as Murder, She Wrote, Blacke's Magic and MacGyver. Adair also played a supporting role as Kate Chase in the Emmy Award-nominated miniseries Lincoln (1988).

Personal life

In 1995, she retired from acting. She and her husband have two adopted children, Lucy Taylor Hayes and Jackson William Hayes.

References

External links 

 

American soap opera actresses
People from Lynchburg, Virginia
20th-century American actresses
Living people
21st-century American women
Year of birth missing (living people)